The 1960 All-Ireland Senior Hurling Championship Final was the 73rd All-Ireland Final and the culmination of the 1960 All-Ireland Senior Hurling Championship, an inter-county hurling tournament for the top teams in Ireland. The match was held at Croke Park, Dublin, on 4 September 1960, between Wexford and Tipperary. The Munster champions lost to their Leinster opponents on a score line of 2-15 to 0-11.

Match details

References

All-Ireland Senior Hurling Championship Final
All-Ireland Senior Hurling Championship Final, 1960
All-Ireland Senior Hurling Championship Final
All-Ireland Senior Hurling Championship Finals
Tipperary GAA matches
Wexford GAA matches